The Loretto is a multipurpose venue in the Westport neighborhood of Kansas City, Missouri.   It was adapted from a former girls' academy known as Loretto Academy, dedicated in 1904 as a "boarding and day school for girls."  It is named after the Sisters of Loretto, who established a presence in Kansas City in 1899.

History
The land upon which Loretto Academy was built was purchased in September 1902 by Mother M. Praxedes Carty.  The architect of Loretto Academy, Thomas P. Barnett of Barnett, Haynes & Barnett, was soon after appointed the architect of the Cathedral Basilica of St. Louis.

The academy was the site of a fire in 1909 at a Halloween party; three students lost their lives when a paper dress became ignited by a lit jack-o'-lantern.

Loretto Academy admitted its first black student in September 1947.

The Academy moved to 12411 Wornall Road in 1966.

Subsequent uses
In 1966 the site was sold to Calvary Bible College, who owned it for two decades; it then passed through the hands of three owners until a 1993 foreclosure.  By then it had been listed on the National Register of Historic Places for a decade.

As The Loretto, it currently hosts weddings in the historic cathedral chapel and wedding receptions in the ballroom. The building also offers apartments and offices.  Its current owner, Loretto Redevelopment Corp., taking advantage of a tax abatement, has had plans for further redevelopment since 1996; as of 2011, those plans include "a hotel conversion, a small office space facing Mercier Street and two small rental buildings" on the  site.

See also
Loretto Academy (St. Louis, Missouri), also NRHP-listed

References

External links
 

Kansas City
Colonial Revival architecture in Missouri
School buildings completed in 1902
Educational institutions established in 1904
Educational institutions disestablished in 1964
Defunct high schools in Missouri
Schools in Kansas City, Missouri
School buildings on the National Register of Historic Places in Missouri
National Register of Historic Places in Kansas City, Missouri
1904 establishments in Missouri